Northfield could be the following places in the Province of Nova Scotia, Canada:
 Northfield, Hants, Nova Scotia (in Hants County)
 Northfield, Queens, Nova Scotia (in the Region of Queens Municipality)
 In Lunenberg County:
 Northfield, Lunenberg, Nova Scotia
 Lower Northfield, Nova Scotia
 West Northfield, Nova Scotia
 Upper Northfield, Nova Scotia